Kaagna  is a village in Kanepi Parish, Põlva County, in southeastern Estonia.

References 

Villages in Põlva County